Mike Miranda may refer to:

 Michele Miranda (1896–1973), longtime member and eventual consigliere of the Genovese crime family
 Mike Miranda (BMX rider) (born 1963), former American professional Bicycle Motocross (BMX) racer
 Michael Miranda, Filipino basketball player